Shenzhou may refer to:

 Shenzhou, or "Divine Land", one of the Chinese names of China
 Shenzhou program, a crewed spaceflight initiative by the People's Republic of China
 Shenzhou (spacecraft), spacecraft from China which first carried a Chinese astronaut into orbit in 2003
 8256 Shenzhou, Main Belt asteroid
 Shenzhou (album), an album by ambient musician Biosphere
 Hasee, a Chinese computer company
 USS Shenzhou, a Federation starship on Star Trek: Discovery

Locations
 Shenzhou City in Hebei, China
 Shen Prefecture, a prefecture between the 6th and 20th centuries in modern Hebei, China

See also
 Shen Zhou (1427–1509), Ming dynasty painter
 Zhou Shen (born 1992), Chinese singer